This is a list of Category A listed buildings in Clackmannanshire, Scotland.

In Scotland, the term listed building refers to a building or other structure officially designated as being of "special architectural or historic interest".  Category A structures are those considered to be buildings of "national or international importance, either architecturally or historically". Listing was begun by a provision in the Town and Country Planning (Scotland) Act 1947, and the current legislative basis for listing is the Planning (Listed Buildings and Conservation Areas) (Scotland) Act 1997.  The authority for listing rests with Historic Environment Scotland, an executive agency of the Scottish Government, which inherited this role from the Scottish Development Department in 1991. Once listed, severe restrictions are imposed on the modifications allowed to a building's structure or its fittings. Listed building consent must be obtained from local authorities prior to any alteration to such a structure. There are approximately 47,000 listed buildings in Scotland, of which around 8 percent (some 3,800) are Category A.

Some 300 listed buildings are recorded in the Clackmannanshire Development Plan, of which 18 are Category A. These represent a variety of types and ages of structure. Listed structures range in size from William Henry Playfair's Greek-revival Dollar Academy, to the tiny Johnstone Mausoleum at Alva. Many of the earliest buildings, including the Old Kirk at Tullibody, and several late-medieval castles and tower houses, are now in ruins, although Alloa Tower is still habitable. Later dwellings include the 17th-century Menstrie Castle, 18th-century Brucefield, and 20th-century Gean House. The 19th-century cast iron bridge at Cambus is one of the earliest in Scotland. The textile mills and warehouse of the former Kilncraigs factory represent 20th-century heritage, and were restored in 2004.

Listed buildings 

|}

Notes

See also
Scheduled monuments in Clackmannanshire

References

External links

Clackmannanshire